Eric Fotou Kamdem (born 2 January 1986) is a Cameroon-born footballer who has played for the Thai side BEC Tero Sasana F.C. since February 2008.

References

1986 births
Living people
Cameroonian footballers
Cameroonian expatriate footballers
Expatriate footballers in Thailand
Cameroonian expatriate sportspeople in Thailand
Eric Fotou Kamdem
Association football midfielders